This is a list of antineoplastic agents used to treat cancer.

References 

Antineoplastic drugs
Chemotherapy